This is a list of notable Russian Americans, including both original immigrants who obtained American citizenship and their American descendants.

To be included in this list, the person must have a Wikipedia article showing they are Russian American or must have references showing they are Russian American and are notable.

Arts

Performance 

 Paul Abrahamian (born 1993), reality television personality, of Russian and Armenian descent
 Dianna Agron (born 1986), actress, father is of Russian Jewish ancestry.
 Monique Alexander (born 1982), Pornographic actress, actress and model
 Woody Allen (born 1935), actor, writer, director, and musician, his mother was of Russian Jewish ancestry.
 Pamela Anderson (born 1967), Canadian-American actress, sex symbol, activist known for her roles on the television series Baywatch, mother is of Russian ancestry.
 René Auberjonois (1940–2019), Tony Award-winning character actor (and grandson of the painter), best known for his early 1980s role as Clayton Endicott III on the television show Benson and his role as Odo on Star Trek: Deep Space Nine.
 Olga Baclanova (1893–1974), actress.
 Anna Baryshnikov (born 1992), actress, daughter of Mikhail Baryshnikov
 Shura Baryshnikov (born 1981), dancer, choreographer, actress
 Emma Berman (born 2008), American actress, of Russian descent
 Jon Bon Jovi (born 1962), singer-songwriter, mother of partial Russian descent
 Alexey Brodovitch (1898–1971), the pioneer of graphic design, the person who created a prototype of the modern glossy magazine about fashion.
 Eric Balfour (born 1977), actor, portraying Milo Pressman in 24, is of Russian Jewish descent.
 Sasha Barrese (born 1981), actress of Irish, Dutch, American Indian, and Russian descent.
 Mikhail Baryshnikov (born 1948), dancer and actor, immigrant from Russia.
 Michael Bay (born 1965), American film director and producer (Bay's grandfather was Russian).
 Irving Berlin (1888–1989), Russian-born, considered one of the greatest songwriters in American history, nominated eight times for Academy Awards.
 Jack Black (born 1969), actor, comedian, musician, his mother is of Russian Jewish descent.
 Michael Bolton (born 1953), singer, all of his grandparents were Jewish immigrants from Russia.
 Agnes Bruckner (born 1985), actress, mother is Russian background.
 Yul Brynner (1920–1985), Russian-born American actor, won Academy Award.
 Cheryl Burke (born 1984), professional dancer is well known for starring on the television series Dancing with the Stars, father is Russian and Irish descent.
 Semyon Bychkov (born 1952), conductor
 Amanda Bynes (born 1986), actress, mother of Russian Jewish descent.
 Dove Cameron (born 1996), actress of Russian descent
 Eddie Cantor (1892–1964), actor and dancer, parents were Jewish immigrants from Russia.
 Timothée Chalamet (born 1995), actor, mother is of Russian Jewish descent.
 Michael Chekhov (1891–1955), actor and dancer, immigrant from Russia.
 Jennifer Connelly (born 1970), actress, mother is of Russian Jewish and Polish Jewish descent.
 Lydia Cornell (born Lydia Korniloff, 1953), actress, father is of Russian descent.
 David Copperfield (born 1956), illusionist and stage magician, paternal grandparents were Jewish immigrants from Russia.
 Eric Dane (born 1972), actor, of partial Russian-Jewish descent.
 Gavin DeGraw (born 1977), musician, mother is of Russian Jewish descent.
 Alexis Denisof (born 1966), actor, father is of mostly Russian ancestry.
 Kat Dennings (born 1986), American actress. Grandparents were Russian Jewish immigrants. 
 Leonardo DiCaprio (born 1974), actor, Academy Award winner, maternal grandmother was Russian
 Jim Downey (born 1952), comedy writer.
 Michael Dudikoff (born 1954), actor, father was an immigrant from Russia.
 Aaron Eckhart (born 1968), actor, father is of German and Russian descent.
 Ansel Elgort (born 1994), actor, his father is of Russian-Jewish descent.
 Val Emmich (born 1979), singer-songwriter and actor of Italian, Russian, and German ancestry.
 Peter Falk (1927–2011), born to a Polish Jewish father and a Russian Jewish mother.
 Tina Fey (born 1970), American actress and comedian, father is of part-Russian descent.
 Carrie Fisher (1956–2016), actress, father was of Russian Jewish descent.
 Michel Fokine (1880–1942), dancer and choreographer.
 Olga Fonda (born 1982), actress and model.
 Harrison Ford (born 1942), actor, mother was of Russian Jewish descent.
 Dave Franco (born 1985), actor, mother of Russian Jewish descent.
 James Franco (born 1978), actor, mother of Russian Jewish descent.
 Isabelle Fuhrman (born 1997), actress (Mother, Elena Fuhrman, is a Russian-Jewish immigrant, father is of Russian Jewish descent).
 Drew Fuller (born 1980), actor of Russian, Scottish and English heritage.
 Edward Furlong (born 1977), actor, the star of such film as Terminator 2: Judgment Day and American History X, his father is of Russian origin.
 Galen Gering (born 1971), actor of Russian Jewish (father) and Basque Spanish (mother) descent.
 George Gershwin (1898–1937), composer and pianist, author of Rhapsody in Blue, Russian Jewish and Ukrainian Jewish ancestry.
 Alexander Godunov (1949–1995), dancer and choreographer.
 Katerina Graham (born 1989), actress, singer, record producer, dancer, and model, mother of Russian Jewish ancestry.
 Seth Green (born 1974), actor, part Russian Jewish ancestry.
 Jake Gyllenhaal (born 1980), his mother Naomi Foner Gyllenhaal is of Russian Jewish descent.
 Maggie Gyllenhaal (born 1977), her mother Naomi Foner Gyllenhaal is of Russian Jewish descent.
 Armie Hammer (born 1986), actor, father of part Russian Jewish/Russian descent.
 Juliana Harkavy (born 1985), actress, has Russian ancestors.
 Ben Harper (born 1969), singer-songwriter, Jewish mother of Russian and Lithuanian ancestry.
 Barbara Hershey (born 1948), actress, father of partial Russian Jewish descent.
 Fedor Jeftichew (1868–1904), freak show attraction nicknamed "Jojo the dog-faced man" and a star of the Barnum Circus.
 Kidada Jones (born 1974), actress, model, and fashion designer, daughter of actress Peggy Lipton and musician Quincy Jones; her mother is of Russian Jewish descent.
 Rashida Jones (born 1976), actress, model, and musician, daughter of actress Peggy Lipton, mother is of Russian Jewish descent.
 Milla Jovovich (born 1975), actress and model, born in Kyiv to a Russian mother and a Serbian father.
 Stacy Kamano (born 1974), actress of German, Russian, Polish and Japanese descent.
 Lila Kedrova (1909–2000), Russian-born French-American actress, won Academy Award for Best Supporting Actress.
 Olga Kern (born 1975), Russian-born classical pianist, won the 11th Van Cliburn International Piano Competition, direct family ties to both Rachmaninov and Tchaikovsky.
 Justin Kirk (born 1969), stage and film actor, mother is of Russian Jewish descent.
 Charles Klapow (born 1980), American choreographer and dance instructor, Emmy Award winner, father of Russian origin.
 Christopher Knight (born 1957), actor.
 Walter Koening (born 1936) parents were Russian Jewish immigrants
 Theodore Kosloff (1882–1956), dancer and choreographer.
 Lenny Kravitz (born 1964), American singer, father of Russian Jewish descent.
 Zoë Kravitz (born 1988), American actress, singer and model daughter of Lenny Kravitz, both parents of half Russian Jewish descent.
 Mila Kunis (born 1983), Russian Jewish immigrant (born in Ukrainian SSR).
 Joe Lando (born 1961), film actor.
 Feodor Lark (born 1997), Russian-born television actor.
 Logan Lerman (born 1992), of Russian Jewish, Polish Jewish, and Lithuanian Jewish descent
 Margarita Levieva (born 1980), Russian-born Jewish American actress. Born in the Soviet Union, she was a professional gymnast before going on to star in the films The Invisible, Adventureland and Spread
 Peggy Lipton (1946–2019), actress, of Russian Jewish ancestry
 Karina Lombard (born 1969), actress and singer of Lakota Sioux, Russian, Italian and Swiss descent
 Annet Mahendru (born 1985), actress, mother is of Russian descent
James Maslow (born 1990), actor and singer of Scots Irish, English, and Russian Jewish descent
 Marlee Matlin (born 1965), actress who starred in Children of a Lesser God, of Russian Jewish descent
 Walter Matthau (1920–2000), actor and comedian, parents were Jewish immigrants from Russia
 Blake Michael (born 1996), actor of Russian Jewish descent
 Wentworth Miller (born 1972), actor, mother of partial Russian descent
 Taylor Momsen (born 1993), actress, musician and model, she fronts the rock band The Pretty Reckless
 Mandy Moore (born 1984), actress, singer, of Russian Jewish descent (from her maternal grandfather).
 Vic Morrow (1929-1982), actor, parents were Russian Jewish immigrants
 Sarah Natochenny (born 1987), actress
 Alla Nazimova (1879–1945), theater and film actress, Jewish immigrant from Russia 
 Nancy Novotny (born 1963), voice actress, radio personality
 Pat O'Brien (born 1965), guitarist, half Russian
 Larisa Oleynik (born 1981), actress (Mad Men, 3rd Rock from the Sun), father of Russian descent
 Mandy Patinkin (born 1952), actor and singer, of Russian Jewish descent
 Sean Penn (born 1960), two-time Academy Award winning actor, paternal grandparents Jewish immigrants from Russia and Lithuania
 Michael Perretta (born 1976), American hip hop musician, better known as Evidence, Russian mother
 Lee Philips (1927-1999) (Born Leon Friedman)parents were Russian Jewish immigrants

 Joaquin Phoenix (born 1974), actor, Jewish mother of Russian and Hungarian ancestry
 River Phoenix (1970–1993), actor, Jewish mother of Russian and Hungarian ancestry
 Bronson Pinchot (born 1959), actor, best known for Perfect Strangers whose father, born Henry  Poncharavsky, is of Russian ancestry
 Alexander Polinsky (b. 1974), actor
 Natalie Portman (born 1981), actress, of Russian Jewish, Polish Jewish, Romanian Jewish, and Austrian Jewish ancestry
 Mike Portnoy (born 1967), musician, founding member of American heavy metal band Dream Theater
 Princess Superstar (born 1971), musician, father is of Russian Jewish descent
 Sergei Rachmaninoff (1873–1943), Russian-born composer who immigrated to the US in 1918 and lived there until his death in 1943. He acquired U.S. citizenship in 1943.
 Sam Raimi (born 1959), Jewish American film, producer, actor and writer, whose parents came from Russia and Hungary
 Ted Raimi (born 1965), actor and brother of Sam Raimi, star of Xena: Warrior Princess
 Raven (born 1979), drag queen and reality-television star
 Sasha Velour (born 1987), drag queen and winner of RuPaul's Drag Race Season 9
 Joan Rivers (1933–2014), comedian, parents were Russian Jewish immigrants
 Sasha Roiz (born 1973), Russian Jewish immigrant (born in Tel Aviv, Israel)
 Paul Rudd (born 1969), American actor of Russian Jewish ancestry.
 Natalya Rudakova (born 1985), actress
 Olesya Rulin (born 1986), actress and singer, immigrant from Russia
 Melanie Safka-Schekeryk (born 1947), folk singer, father is of Russian and Ukrainian ancestry
 Steven Seagal (born 1952), actor, father was of Russian Jewish descent
 Jack Shaindlin (1909–1978), composer, musical director of the March of Time newsreel series
 Peter Shukoff (born 1979), YouTuber, co-founded ERB, of Russian descent
 Jenny Slate (born 1982), actress, comedian and author Russian Jewish origin.
 Regina Spektor (born 1980), Russian born American singer-songwriter and pianist, born in Moscow
 Leonard Stone (1927-2011), father Russian Jewish immigrant from Russia
 Igor Stravinsky (1882–1971), composer and pianist
 Michael Strong (1918-1980) (b. Cecil Natapoff) parents were Russian Jewish immigrants
 Tara Strong (born 1973), Canadian-born actor whose family is of Russian Jewish descent
 Gene Stupnitsky (born 1977), screenwriter, born in Kyiv, now Ukraine
 Svoy (born 1980), Russian-born American songwriter/producer for Universal Music Group
 Gene Wilder (1933-2016), actor, father was a Russian immigrant and mother was of Polish descent
 George Gaynes (1917–2016), actor, singer
 Tonearm (Ilia Bis), performance musician
 Michelle Trachtenberg (born 1985), television and film actress, mother is an immigrant Jewish from Russia  
 Sofia Vassilieva (born 1992), actress, parents were Russian immigrants
 Lana Wood (born 1946), actress, parents were immigrants from Russia
 Natalie Wood (1938–1981), Academy Award-nominated actress, won a Golden Globe, parents were immigrants from Russia
 Anton Yelchin (1989–2016), actor, Jewish immigrant from Russia
 Elena Zoubareva (born 1972), opera singer, immigrant from Russia

Visual arts
 Jane Aaron (1948–2015), filmmaker
 Miya Ando (born 1978), artist
 Andrey Avinoff (1884-1949), artist and painter
 Irwin Chanin (1891–1988), architect and builder whose skyline signature was formed of jazzy Art Deco towers and six elegant Broadway theaters
 Dimitri Devyatkin (born 1949), filmmaker and video artist
 Misha Frid (born 1938), sculptor, artist, graphic designer and filmmaker
 Alexander Golitzen (1908–2005), TV and theater art director
 Ilya Kabakov, (born 1933) sculptor, painter, installation artist
 Fyodor Kamensky (1836–1913), sculptor
 Louis Lozowick (1892–1973), was an American painter and printmaker. He was born in the Russian Empire, came to the United States in 1906
 Ernst Neizvestny (1925–2016), sculptor, painter, graphic artist, and art philosopher
 Elizabeth Shoumatoff (1888–1980), portrait painter
 Israel Tsvaygenbaum (born 1961), Russian-American Painter and Russian Jewish descent

Literature

 Isaac Asimov (1920–1992), science fiction writer
 Saul Bellow (1915–2005), writer
 Reginald Bretnor (1911–1992), science fiction and fantasy writer
 Joseph Brodsky (1940–1996), Nobel Prize in Literature 1987
 Michael Dorfman (born 1965), writer
 Sergei Dovlatov (1941–1990), short story writer and novelist
 Alexander Genis (born 1953), writer and journalist, emigrated from Russian in 1977
 Daniel Genis (born 1978), writer and journalist, parents emigrated from Russian in 1977
 Jacob Gordin (1853–1909), playwright
 Michelle Izmaylov (born 1991), Russian-American science fiction and fantasy writer
 Vladimir Nabokov (1899–1977), writer
 Chuck Palahniuk (born 1962), novelist & freelance journalist, most known for the award-winning novel Fight Club
 Ayn Rand (1905–1982), born as Alisa Zinovyevna Rosenbaum, a Russian-born American writer and philosopher and novelist
 Michael Rostovtzeff (1870–1952), writer
 Alex Shoumatoff (born 1946), magazine journalist and author
 David Shrayer-Petrov (born 1936), Moscow-born author, medical scientist, and former refusenik
 Maxim D. Shrayer (born 1967), Moscow-born bilingual author, literary scholar and translator
 Gary Shteyngart (born 1972), Russian-born writer

Science
 Alexei A. Abrikosov (1928–2017), theoretical physicist
 Boris Altshuler (born 1955), contributed to the theory of universal conduction fluctuations
 Andrey Avinoff (1884-1949), museology, lepidoptery, entomology
 Alexander Beilinson (born 1957), mathematician known for contributions to representation theory, algebraic geometry and mathematical physics
 Viktor Belenko (born 1947), aerospace engineer, former Soviet Air Force pilot
 Lera Boroditsky (born 1976), cognitive scientist
 Alexander Bolonkin (born 1933), cybernetician
 Theodosius Dobzhansky (1900–1975), biologist
 Alexei L. Efros (born 1938), physicist, received the Oliver E. Buckley Condensed Matter Prize 
 Alexander Esenin-Volpin (1924–2016), mathematician
 Alex Eskin (born 1965), mathematician
 Sergey Fomin (born 1958), mathematician
 Edward Frenkel (born 1968), mathematician
 Lex Fridman (born 1986), computer scientist
 George Gamow (1904–1968), astrophysicist, developer of Lemaître's Big Bang theory, theoretical explanation of alpha decay via quantum tunneling
 Dmitri Z. Garbuzov (1940–2006), physicist, was one of the pioneers and inventors of room temperature continuous-wave-operating diode lasers and high-power diode lasers
 Victor Galitski, physicist, a theorist in the areas of condensed matter physics and quantum physics
 Moses Gomberg (1866–1947), the founder of radical chemistry
 Lev Gor'kov (1929–2016), pioneering work in the field of superconductivity
 Vladimir Nikolayevich Ipatieff (1867–1952), chemist, important contributions are in the field of petroleum chemistry and catalysts
 Anton Kapustin (born 1971), theoretical physicist
 Morris S. Kharasch (1895–1957), chemistry
 Mikhail Khovanov (born 1972), mathematician
 Sergei Khrushchev (1935-2020), professor & son of former Soviet Premier Nikita Khrushchev
 Olga Kocharovskaya (born 1956), known for her contributions to quantum optics and gamma ray modulation
 Simon Kuznets (1901–1985), economist, statistician, demographer, and economic historian, the winner of 1971 Nobel Memorial Prize in Economic Sciences
 Anatoly Larkin (1932–2005), physicist, discovered collective pinning of magnetic flux in superconductors, predicted paraconductivity, made essential contributions to the theory of weak localization, as well as developed the concept of the Ehrenfest time and its effect on phenomena of quantum chaos
 Andrei Linde (born 1948), developed a theory of cosmological phase transitions, one of the main authors of the inflationary universe theory, as well as the theory of eternal inflation and inflationary multiverse
 Alexander Nikolayevich Lodygin (1847–1923), electrical engineer and inventor, one of inventors of the incandescent light bulb
 Mikhail Lukin (born 1971), theoretical and experimental physicist
 Grigory Margulis (born 1946), mathematician known for his introduction of methods from ergodic theory into diophantine approximation
 Abraham Maslow (1908–1970), psychologist
 Alexander A. Maximow (1874–1928), in the fields of medicine, histology, embryology and hematology
 Alexander Migdal (born 1945), physicist, known for quantum chromodynamics and conformal field theory
 Guenakh Mitselmakher, physicist e contributed to the discovery of GW150914 using his developed conductor
 Andrei Okounkov (born 1969), the winner of the Fields Medal (2006)
 Ivan Ostromislensky (1880–1939), chemistry, pharmacy
 Alexey Pajitnov (born 1956), software engineer and video game designer, inventor of Tetris
 Vladimir Pentkovski (1946–2012), the researcher who led the team that developed the architecture for the Pentium III processor
 Boris Podolsky (1896–1966), physicist known for EPR paradox
 Alexander M. Polyakov (born 1945), known for contributions to quantum field theory and vacuum angle in QCD
 Gennady Potapenko (1894–1979), radio astronomer 
 Nikolay Prokof'ev, physicist, known for his works on theory of supersolids includes the theory of superfluidity of crystalline defects
 Tatiana Proskouriakoff (1909–1985), Russian-American Mayanist
 Anatol Rapoport (1911–2007), American mathematical psychologist
 Alexander L. Rosenberg (1946–2012), mathematician
 Ivan Raimi (born 1956), Doctor of Medicine, osteopathic
 Vladimir Rojansky (1900–1981), physicist
 David Shrayer-Petrov (born 1936), medical scientist, microbiologist, immunologist, biophage specialist
 Yakov Sinai (born 1935), mathematician known for his work on dynamical systems. Sinai has won several awards, including the Nemmers Prize, the Wolf Prize in Mathematics and the Abel Prize
 James Alexander Shohat (1886–1944), mathematician
 Alexander Shulgin (1925–2014), pharmacologist, chemist and drug developer
 Mark Stockman (1947–2020), physicist
 Otto Struve (1897–1963), astronomer
 Boris Svistunov (born 1959), physicist, co-inventor of the widely used Worm Monte-Carlo algorithm
 Jacob Tamarkin (1888–1945), mathematician and vice-president of American Mathematical Society in 1942-43
 Leon Theremin (1896–1993), physicist, inventor of the Theremin
 Peter Turchin (born 1957), biologist and the father of cliodynamics
 Petr Ufimtsev (born 1931), Russian-American mathematician and physicist
 J. V. Uspensky (1883–1947), mathematician
 Arkady Vainshtein (born 1942), theoretical physicist
 Vladimir Vapnik (born 1936), developed the theory of the support vector machine also known as the "fundamental theory of learning" an important part of computational learning theory
 Leonid Vaseršteĭn (born 1944), mathematician known for providing a proof of Quillen–Suslin theorem
 Lev Vekker (1918–2001), psychologist
 Vladimir Voevodsky (1966–2017), the winner of the Fields Medal (2002)
 Alexander Vyssotsky (1888–1973), astronomer
 Paul Wiegmann (born 1952), physicist, pioneering contributions to the field of quantum integrable systems, including the exact solution of Kondo model
 Vladimir Yurkevich (1885–1964), naval architect
 Boris Zeldovich (1944–2018), physicist
 Efim Zelmanov (born 1955), winner of the Fields Medal (1994), professor at the University of California, San Diego
 George Zweig (born 1937), proposed the existence of quarks at CERN, independently of Murray Gell-Mann
 Vladimir Kosma Zworykin (1888–1982), one of the inventors of television

Sports

 Benjamin Agosto (born 1982), ice dancer.
 Doc Alexander (1897–1975), NFL football player and coach
 Lyle Alzado (1949–1992), NFL All Pro defensive tackle
 Amanda Anisimova (born 2001), tennis player
 Al Axelrod (1921–2004), Olympic fencer - bronze medalist
 Deborah Babashoff (born 1970), competition swimmer
 Jack Babashoff (born 1955), Olympic swimmer - silver medalist
 Shirley Babashoff (born 1957), Olympic swimmer - gold/silver medalist
 Bo Belinsky (1936–2001), baseball player.
 Mohini Bhardwaj (born 1978), gymnast.
 Fred Biletnikoff (born 1943), football wide receiver and coach.
 Sue Bird (born 1980), professional women's basketball player.
 Alex Bogomolov, Jr. (born 1983), professional tennis player.
 Nathan Bor (1913–1972), boxer.
 Alex Bregman (born 1994), baseball player
 Daniel Bukantz (1917–2008), four-time Olympic fencer
 Maxim Dlugy (born 1966), grandmaster of chess.
 Brandon Dubinsky (born 1986), hockey player
 Rod Dyachenko (born 1983), footballer.
 Curtis Enis (born 1976), football player.
 Benny Friedman (1905–1982), NFL Hall of Fame football player
 Alex Galchenyuk (born 1994), hockey player
 Nastasya Generalova (born 2000), rhythmic gymnast, Russian mother
 Bill Goldberg (born 1966), professional NFL football player and undefeated wrestler
 Charles Goldenberg (1911–1986), All-Pro NFL player
 Alexander Goldin (born 1964), chess grandmaster
 Jon Robert Holden (born 1976), basketball player for Russian national team
 Nat Holman (1896–1995), Hall of Fame basketball player
 Red Holzman (1920–1998), NBA Hall of Fame basketball player and coach.
 Irving Jaffee (1906–1981), Olympic speed skater; two gold medals
 Sofia Kenin (born 1998), tennis player
 Andrei Kirilenko (born 1981), basketball player
 Anna Kotchneva (born 1970), gymnast
 Anna Kournikova (born 1981), tennis player and model
 Vladimir Kozlov (born 1979), professional wrestler
 Travis Kvapil (born 1976), race car driver
 Varvara Lepchenko (born 1986), professional tennis player.
 Nastia Liukin (born 1989), gymnast.
 Valeri Liukin (born 1966), artistic gymnast
 Cade McNown (born 1977), football player
 Frank Mir (born 1979), mixed martial artist.
 Boris Nachamkin (born 1933), NBA basketball player
 Evgeni Nabokov (born 1975), San Jose Sharks' former Goalie
 Patrick O'Neal (sportscaster) (born 1967), studio host and reporter
 Denis Petukhov (born 1978), figure skater
 Sergei Raad (born 1982), soccer player
 Jack Sack (1902-1980), American football player and coach
 Dmitry Salita (born 1982), boxer
 Ossie Schectman (1919–2013), basketball player who scored the first basket in National Basketball Association history
 Andy Seminick (1920–2004), professional baseball player.
 Maria Sharapova (born 1987), tennis player
 Allie Sherman (1923–2015), National Football League player and head coach
 Mose Solomon (1900–1966), the "Rabbi of Swat," Major League Baseball player
 Kerri Strug (born 1977), gymnast
 Peter Tchernyshev (born 1971), ice-dancer
 Phil Weintraub (1907–1987), Major League Baseball first baseman & outfielder
 Ted Williams (1918–2002), Major League Baseball left fielder

Military
 Boris Pash (1900–1995), Colonel of the US Army
 John Basil Turchin (1822–1901), Union army general in the American Civil War

Business

 Marc Benioff (born 1964), founder of Salesforce
 Michael Bloomberg (born 1942), Mayor of New York City, founder of Bloomberg business empire
 Sergey Brin (born 1973), co-founder of Google, Russian-Jewish immigrant
 Boris Chaikovsky (1925–1996), founder of Tele-King International
 Valentin Gapontsev (1939–2021), fiber laser technology pioneer, founder of IPG Photonics
 Alexander Poniatoff (1892–1980), founder of Ampex Corporation
 Alexander P. de Seversky (1894–1974), founder of the Seversky Aircraft Corporation, founder and trustee of the New York Institute of Technology
 Igor Sikorsky (1889–1972), an aviation pioneer in both helicopters and fixed-wing aircraft, founder of the Sikorsky Aircraft Corporation, a leading US helicopter manufacturer
 Serge Sorokko (born 1954), art dealer, publisher and patron
 Michael Stroukoff (1883–1973), President of the Chase Aircraft Company, founder of the Stroukoff Aircraft Corporation
 André Tchelistcheff (1901–1994), America's most influential post-Prohibition winemaker
 Ratmir Timashev (born 1966), founder and CEO of Veeam Software.

Politics
 Bella Abzug (1920-1998), former Representative from New York (Both of her parents were Russian Jewish immigrants)
Alec Brook-Krasny (born 1958), first Soviet-born Russian speaker to become a member of the New York State Assembly
 Ben Cardin (born 1943), politician of Russian Jewish descent
 William Cohen (born 1940), father of Russian Jewish descent
 Russ Feingold (born 1953), partial Russian Jewish descent
 Al Franken (born 1951), maternal grandmother of Russian Jewish descent
 Gary Johnson (born 1953), mother of partial Russian descent
 Bernie Sanders (born 1941), mother of partial Russian descent
 Scott Stringer (born 1960), New York City Comptroller and Borough President of Manhattan, of part Russian Jewish descent
 Jim Talent (born 1956), former U.S. Senator, paternal grandparents were Jewish immigrants from Russia

Economics 
 Simon Kuznets (1901–1985), contribution to the transformation of economics into an empirical science and to the formation of quantitative economic history
 Wassily Leontief (1905–1999), economist, Nobel Prize 1973

Modeling

 Angelika Kallio (born 1972), model born in Riga
 Tatiana Kovylina (born 1981), model born in Kazan
 Josie Maran (born 1978), model of Russian descent
 Michele Merkin (born 1975), model and television host, also of Swedish and Russian Jewish descent
 Anya Monzikova (born 1984), model and actress born in Vologda
 Irina Pantaeva (born 1972), model and actress born in Ulan-Ude
 Kristina Pimenova (born 2005), child model and actress
 Sasha Pivovarova (born 1985), model born in Moscow
 Natasha Poly (born 1985), model born in Perm
 Vlada Roslyakova (born 1987), model born in Omsk
 Tatiana Sorokko (born 1971), model and fashion writer born in Arzamas-16
 Daria Strokous (born 1990), model born in Moscow
 Eugenia Volodina (born 1984), model born in Kazan
 Anne Vyalitsyna (born 1986), model and actress

Other
 Svetlana Alliluyeva (1926–2011), daughter of Joseph Stalin
 Benny Benson (1913–1972), designer of flag of Alaska.
 Antuan Bronshtein (1972–1973), convicted murderer; Russian immigrant
 Jacob W. Davis (1831–1908), tailor, invention of Jeans
 Peter Demens (1850–1919), is one of the founders of the U.S. city of Saint Petersburg, Florida.
 Max Factor Sr. (1877–1938), founder of the cosmetics giant Max Factor & Company, was born in Russian Poland. Russian nobility appointed Factor the official cosmetics expert for the royal family and the Imperial Russian Grand Opera
 Betty Freeman (1921–2009), art philanthropist, father was a Russian immigrant
 Masha Gessen (born 1967), journalist, author, translator and activist; Russian Jewish immigrant
 Bianna Golodryga (born 1978), journalist; Russian Jewish immigrant (born in Moldovan SSR)
 John A. Gotti (born 1964), leader of the Gambino Crime Family of the Cosa Nostra. Mother is of Russian descent
 Oleg Kalugin (born 1934), former head of KGB operations in the United States
 Taras Kulakov (born 1987), YouTube personality known for life hack and gadget reviewing videos, of Ukrainian descent.
 Loren Leman (born 1950), former lieutenant governor of Alaska, one of his ancestors was a Russian settler who married an indigenous Alutiiq woman in Kodiak while Russia claimed and colonized Alaska centuries ago
 Neil Sedaka (born 1939), singer and songwriter
 Pitirim Sorokin (1889–1968), founded Harvard Sociology Dept 1930
 Mikhail Varshavski (born 1989), known professionally as Doctor Mike, Russian-born internet personality and family medicine physician, moved to the U.S. with his family at the age of six.
Vitaly Zdorovetskiy (born 1992), YouTube personality known for his adult rated pranks.

References

 
Americans
Lists of American people by ethnic or national origin
Lists of people by ethnicity
Americans